Hinnerjoki is a village and a former municipality in the Satakunta province, Finland. It was consolidated with Eura in 1970. The village of Hinnerjoki is listed as a Cultural environment of national significance by the Finnish National Board of Antiquities.

Hinnerjoki is the birthplace of the DJ and record producer Darude, known for his 1998 hit single Sandstorm.

References

External links 
 

Villages in Finland
Former municipalities of Finland
Hinnerjoki